Yannik Bangsow (born 21 February 1998) is a German professional footballer who plays for Alemannia Aachen on loan from Eintracht Braunschweig.

Club career
Bangsow joined Alemannia Aachen on loan for the 2021–22 season.

References

Living people
1998 births
Association football goalkeepers
German footballers
Tennis Borussia Berlin players
RB Leipzig players
Eintracht Braunschweig II players
Eintracht Braunschweig players
FC Viktoria Köln players
Alemannia Aachen players
3. Liga players
Regionalliga players
Footballers from Berlin
SC Staaken players